The Republic of China is a state in East Asia, commonly known as Taiwan.

Republic of China may also refer to:
 Government of the Republic of China, the government of the Republic of China based on the Chinese mainland until 1949 and on Taiwan since 1949
 Free area of the Republic of China, also known as Taiwan Area, including Taiwan and associated islands under effective Republic of China jurisdiction
 Chinese Taipei, a designated name formally used by the Republic of China while participating in most international events after the 1979 Nagoya Resolution.
 History of the Republic of China:
 Republic of China (1912–1949), state in East Asia from the end of the Qing dynasty to the end of the Chinese Civil War. The following three regimes were recognized as legitimate Chinese government over all of China under the same name.
 Provisional Government of the Republic of China, the provisional government led by Sun Yat-sen after the fall of the Qing dynasty, 1912
 Beiyang Government, government of the Republic of China based in Peking (present-day Beijing), 1912–1928
 National Government of the Republic of China, the Kuomintang-led government of China based in Nanjing, 1928–1948
 Regional political entities during ROC rule on mainland:
 Nationalist regimes
 Republic of China Military Government, stratocracy, 1917–1920; 1920–1921
 Republic of China, the KMT-led government based in Guangzhou, 1921–1922
 Republic of China, a military junta led by KMT, also based in Guangzhou, 1923–1925
 Wuhan Nationalist Government, Nationalist government led by Wang Jingwei rivalled to its Nanjing counterpart, 1926–1927
 Communist regimes
 Soviet Zone, communist government in China, 1927–1937
 Chinese Soviet Republic, communist government led by Mao Zedong, 1931–1937
 People's Revolutionary Government of the Republic of China, communist government in Fujian, 1933–1934
 Shaan-Gan-Ning Border Region, Mao's communist government during the Second Sino-Japanese War, 1937–1946
 Liberated Zone, communist government after Second Sino-Japanese War, 1946–1949
 Japanese puppet states
 East Hebei Autonomous Government, puppet state of Japan, 1935–1938
 Great Way Municipal Government of Shanghai, puppet state of Japan, 1937–1938
 Provisional Government of the Republic of China, puppet state of Japan, 1937–1940
 Reformed Government of the Republic of China, puppet state of Japan, 1938–1940
 Reorganized National Government of the Republic of China, puppet state of Japan, 1940–1945

See also 
 Republic of China calendar (Minguo calendar) 
 China (disambiguation)
 ROC (disambiguation)
 Government of China (disambiguation)
 Zhōnghuá Mínguó Línshí Zhèngfǔ (disambiguation)